Fanfare for the Common Man is a musical work by the American composer Aaron Copland. It was written in 1942 for the Cincinnati Symphony Orchestra under conductor Eugene Goossens and was inspired in part by a speech made earlier that year by then American Vice President Henry A. Wallace, in which  Wallace proclaimed the dawning of the "Century of the Common Man".

Several alternative versions have been made and fragments of the work have appeared in many subsequent US and British cultural productions, such as in the musical scores of movies.

Instrumentation
This fanfare is written for the following instruments:
 four horns (in F)
 three trumpets (in B)
 three trombones
 tuba
 timpani
 bass drum
 tam-tam

The Fanfare

Copland, in his autobiography, wrote of the request: "Eugene Goossens, conductor of the Cincinnati Symphony Orchestra, had written to me at the end of August about an idea he wanted to put into action for the 1942–43 concert season. During World War I he had asked British composers for a fanfare to begin each orchestral concert. It had been so successful that he thought to repeat the procedure in World War II with American composers". A total of 18 fanfares were written at Goossens' behest, but Copland's is the only one which remains in the standard repertoire.

It was written in response to the US entry into World War II and was inspired in part by a famous 1942 speech
where vice president Henry A. Wallace proclaimed the dawning of the "Century of the Common Man".

Goossens had suggested titles such as Fanfare for Soldiers, or sailors or airmen, and he wrote that "[i]t is my idea to make these fanfares stirring and significant contributions to the war effort...." Copland considered several titles including Fanfare for a Solemn Ceremony and Fanfare for Four Freedoms; to Goossens' surprise, however, Copland titled the piece Fanfare for the Common Man. Goossens wrote, "Its title is as original as its music, and I think it is so telling that it deserves a special occasion for its performance. If it is agreeable to you, we will premiere it 12 March 1943 at income tax time". Copland's reply was "I [am] all for honoring the common man at income tax time".

Copland later used the fanfare as the main theme of the fourth movement of his Third Symphony (composed between 1944 and 1946).

In television and other media
The Chicago Blackhawks of the NHL have used it as part of a pre-game video introduction of the team before it takes to the ice since moving into the United Center in 1994.

Several feature films employ the piece for dramatic effect. John Williams' main themes for the 1978 Superman film are partially based on the fanfare and his original score for Saving Private Ryan draws heavily on its soundworld (though Copland's piece is not actually heard in either movie). In The Patriot, which Williams scored, the music of the final scene before the credits may be a nod to Copland's work. The fanfare functioned as Jimmy King's theme in Ready to Rumble. The Bollywood film Parinda prominently features the piece as background score, including in a haunting opening depicting shots of Bombay.

The first three notes of the piece are coincidentally the same as the sound made by the motors of the MR-73 class of cars on the Montreal Metro as they leave the station and accelerate.

Seven Network in Australia used "Fanfare" to accompany their "7 Sport" opener throughout the 1980s and 1990s. Additionally, Chris Conroy's World of Boats and Chris Conroy's Leisureworld both used a rock version of "Fanfare" for their opening credits.

On September 21, 2012, "Fanfare" was played at Los Angeles International Airport as the Space Shuttle Endeavour touched down after its final flight.

It featured in BBC Television's children's television programme, Melody, as the second piece to inspire Melody's imagination. She imagined a family of elephants enjoying a mud bath.

On May 15, 2014, it was played by the New York Philharmonic at the dedication of the 9/11 Museum in lower Manhattan.

On September 26, 2015, it was played at Independence Hall in Philadelphia as Pope Francis came outside to make a speech on religious freedom, which he delivered from the lectern used by Abraham Lincoln to deliver the Gettysburg Address.

On October 31, 2019, it was played on the roof of Radio24syv's headquarters in Copenhagen, Denmark, at midnight, when the station stopped broadcasting. The station was closed after eight years, because it controversially failed to get its broadcast license and funding renewed, after a long and windy political process.

The New York Philharmonic's version of the work was traditionally played on New Year's Eve when the ball was raised at Times Square.

Professional Darts Player Phil "The Power" Taylor used the opening trumpet salutes as part of his walk-up music during his career. The music would then shift to "The Power" by Snap! as the Walkup continued.

Alternative versions
Copland's fanfare was used in 1977 by British prog-rock band Emerson, Lake & Palmer on the album Works Volume 1. The track became one of the band's biggest hits when an edited version was released as a single that year. It peaked at No. 2 in the UK. Keith Emerson had long been an admirer of Copland's Americana style, previously using Copland's Hoedown on the band's Trilogy album in 1972.

Mannheim Steamroller also has a version on its "American Spirit" album. On August 28, 2010, it was played at the beginning of Glenn Beck's Restoring Honor rally.

On January 12, 2011, the piece opened "Together We Thrive: Tucson and America", the memorial service for the victims of the 2011 Tucson shooting.

In the 1990s,  "Fanfare" began to be used to welcome the winner of the Aintree Grand National Steeplechase from the racecourse to the winner's enclosure as the timing of the piece roughly matched the time it took the winner to make the journey. When the enclosure was moved in 2010, "Fanfare" was used instead to announce the procession of competitors from the paddock to the course before the race. 

Vincent Montana Junior also recorded a version of "Fanfare for the Common Man - Montana" for his second Disco studio project for Atlantic Records ... Vince Montana was a formally a member of MFSB and was the Leader, Writer, Arranger & Producer of the Salsoul Orchestra

References

Bibliography
 Copland 1900 Through 1942, by Aaron Copland and Vivian Perlis, St. Martin's Press, 1984,

External links
 Manuscript score from U.S. Library of Congress.
 Goossens' Fanfares.
 Audio (mp3 and .wav) by U.S. Marine Corps Band.
 Audio sample (.wav) of ELP version.

American patriotic songs
Compositions by Aaron Copland
Seven Sport
CBS Sports Spectacular
Concert band pieces
1942 compositions
Music commissioned by the Cincinnati Symphony Orchestra
Compositions for symphony orchestra
Compositions in B-flat major